Jamie Lynn Corkish (formerly Gray, née Beyerle, born May 26, 1984) is an American sport shooter who won a gold medal at the 2012 Summer Olympics.

She was born in Lebanon, Pennsylvania. At the 2008 Beijing Olympics, competing as Jamie Beyerle, she placed 4th  in Women's 10 metre air rifle and 5th in Women's 50 metre rifle three positions. She placed 2nd at the 2008 ISSF World Cup in Milan. At the 2012 London Olympics, competing as Jamie Gray, she won the gold medal in Women's 50 metre rifle three positions. She set Olympic records with 592 points in the qualification round and 691.9 total points including the final.

Corkish got her start in shooting when she began with a BB gun program at the age of eight. She is a graduate of the University of Alaska Fairbanks and shot for its rifle team.

Personal life
She retired from professional shooting due to a back injury. On November 8, 2014, Jamie married Mike Corkish of Kalispell, Montana. She has two step-children, Morgan and Michael Corkish.  Mike and Jamie added to their family when she gave birth to Tristan Corkish on July 14, 2016. Since her retirement Jamie continues to stay close to the shooting sports through individual coaching, volunteering and speaking engagements. She now makes her home in Meridian, Idaho with Mike and their family.

References

External links

 

1984 births
Living people
American female sport shooters
Shooters at the 2007 Pan American Games
Shooters at the 2008 Summer Olympics
Shooters at the 2012 Summer Olympics
ISSF rifle shooters
Olympic medalists in shooting
Olympic gold medalists for the United States in shooting
People from Lebanon, Pennsylvania
Sportspeople from Pennsylvania
Medalists at the 2012 Summer Olympics
Pan American Games medalists in shooting
Alaska Nanooks rifle shooters
Pan American Games gold medalists for the United States
21st-century American women
20th-century American women